Hørsholm 79'ers Basketball Klub is a Danish basketball club from Hørsholm founded in 1979, playing both in the male and female Danish championships. The women's team is one of the most successful teams in Danish history, having won 9 national championships between 1996 and 2018, including five titles in a row from 2004 to 2008.

History
On January 27, 2018, Hørsholm  won the Danish Women's Basketball Cup after beating SISU BK, 71-64, in the cup finals.

On April 28, 2017, Hørsholm won the women's national championship after defeating Stevnsgade Basketball 68-60 in the fifth and deciding game of the finals series.

In June 2018, Hørsholm announced the men's club would resign to its place in the Basketligaen due to financial problems and would compete in the second tier.

Titles

Women's team
Danish League
 Winners (9): 1996, 2004, 2005, 2006, 2007, 2008, 2010, 2015, 2018
Danish Cup
 Winners (3): 1994, 1995, 2005, 2018

Men's team
Danish League
 Winners (2): 1990–91, 1992–93

Notable players

Men's

 Daniel Mortensen
 Zarko Jukić

Women's

  Joy Burke
  Sandra Lind Þrastardóttir

References

External links 
 Eurobasket.com Horsholm 79ers Page

Basketball teams in Denmark
Basketball teams established in 1979
Hørsholm Municipality